MGC can refer to:

 Machine Gun Corps
 Malvern Girls College
 Massachusetts General Court, legislature of that U.S. state
 Media Gateway Controller, a device in Voice over IP networks
 Medical Grade Cannabis
 Megestrol caproate, a progestin
 Mekong-Ganga Cooperation
 Melbourne Girls' College
 MGC, a British sports car.
 Michael Gordon Clifford
 Middle Georgia College
 Midsize Gas Carrier, a type of ship
 Midwest Gaming Classic, video game trade show in Wisconsin
 Mississippi Gulf Coast
 Mitsubishi Gas Chemical Company, Inc.
 Museums and Galleries Commission
 The Mircom Group of Companies
 The post-nominal for recipients of the British Columbia Medal of Good Citizenship